The 2016 European Darts Trophy was the eighth of ten PDC European Tour events on the 2016 PDC Pro Tour. The tournament took place at the RWE-Sporthalle in Mülheim, Germany, between 9–11 September 2016. It featured a field of 48 players and £115,000 in prize money, with £25,000 going to the winner.

Michael Smith was the defending champion, but he lost 6–5 to James Wade in the quarter-finals.

Michael van Gerwen won the title after defeating Mensur Suljović 6–5 in the final.

Prize money
The prize money of the European Tour events stays the same as last year.

Qualification and format
The top 16 players from the PDC ProTour Order of Merit on 22 June automatically qualified for the event and were seeded in the second round. The remaining 32 places went to players from three qualifying events - 20 from the UK Qualifier (held in Barnsley on 1 July), eight from the European Qualifier on 1 September and four from the Host Nation Qualifier on 8 September.

 Daryl Gurney who had to withdraw from last week's event due to a broken finger on his throwing hand has pulled out of this event after failing to recover.

The following players took part in the tournament:

Top 16
  Michael van Gerwen (winner)
  Peter Wright (quarter-finals)
  James Wade (semi-finals)
  Kim Huybrechts (semi-finals)
  Dave Chisnall (third round)
  Michael Smith (quarter-finals)
  Ian White (third round)
  Benito van de Pas (third round)
  Jelle Klaasen (quarter-finals)
  Mensur Suljović (runner-up)
  Robert Thornton (third round)
  Gerwyn Price (quarter-finals)
  Terry Jenkins (third round)
  Alan Norris (second round)
  Stephen Bunting (second round)
  Simon Whitlock (third round)

UK Qualifier
  Daryl Gurney (withdrew)
  Mervyn King (first round)
  Joe Cullen (third round)
  Justin Pipe (second round)
  Joe Murnan (first round)
  Ritchie Edhouse (first round)
  Josh Payne (second round)
  Jamie Caven (second round)
  Kyle Anderson (second round)
  Keegan Brown (second round)
  Simon Stevenson (first round)
  Andy Jenkins (third round)
  Robbie Green (first round)
  Jamie Lewis (first round)
  Matthew Dennant (first round)
  Ricky Evans (second round)
  Devon Petersen (second round)
  Andy Smith (second round)
  Darren Webster (first round)
  Steve West (first round)

European Qualifier
  Dimitri Van den Bergh (second round)
  Cristo Reyes (first round)
  János Végső (first round)
  Zoran Lerchbacher (second round)
  Jermaine Wattimena (second round)
  Vincent Kamphuis (second round)
  Ronny Huybrechts (first round)
  Vincent van der Voort (second round)

Host Nation Qualifier
  Max Hopp (first round)
  Jyhan Artut (first round)
  Kevin Münch (first round)
  Martin Schindler (second round)
  Justin Webers (first round)

Draw

References

2016 PDC European Tour
2016 in German sport